The 2022 Rally Italia Sardegna (also known as the Rally Italia Sardegna 2022) was a motor racing event for rally cars held from 2 June to 5 June 2022. It was the nineteenth running of the Rally Italia Sardegna. The event was the fifth round of the 2022 World Rally Championship, World Rally Championship-2 and World Rally Championship-3.

Sébastien Ogier and Julien Ingrassia were the defending rally winners. However, they did not defend their title as Ogier undertakes a partial program in 2022 and Ingrassia retired from the sport at the end of the 2021 season. Jari Huttunen and Mikko Lukka were the defending rally winners in the WRC-2 category. Yohan Rossel and Alexandre Coria were the defending rally winners in the WRC-3 category, but Coria was unable to defend his title as he stepped up to the top-tier to co-drive with Adrien Fourmaux for M-Sport.

Ott Tänak and Martin Järveoja won the rally, their first of the season. Their team, Hyundai Shell Mobis WRT, were the manufacturer's winners. Nikolay Gryazin and Konstantin Aleksandrov won the World Rally Championship-2 category. Jan Černý and Tomáš Střeska won the World Rally Championship-3 category.

Background

Entry list
The following crews were entered into the rally. The event was open to crews competing in the World Rally Championship, its support categories, the World Rally Championship-2 and World Rally Championship-3, and privateer entries that are not registered to score points in any championship. Eleven cars were entered under Rally1 regulations, and thirty-six Rally2 crews in the World Rally Championship-2 and four Rally3 crews in the World Rally Championship-3.

Itinerary
All dates and times are CEST (UTC+2).

Report

WRC Rally1

Classification

Special stages

Championship standings

WRC-2 Rally2

Classification

Special stages

Championship standings

WRC-3 Rally3

Classification

Special stages

Championship standings

Notes

References

External links
  
 2022 Rally Italia Sardegna at eWRC-results.com
 2022 Rally Italia Sardegna at rally-maps.com 

Italy
2022 in Italian motorsport
June 2022 sports events in Italy
2022